A tertiary color or intermediate color is a color made by mixing full saturation of one primary color with half saturation of another primary color and none of a third primary color, in a given color space such as RGB, CMYK (more modern) or RYB (traditional).

Tertiary colors have general names, one set of names for the RGB color wheel and a different set for the RYB color wheel. These names are shown below.

Another definition of tertiary color is provided by color theorists such as Moses Harris and Josef Albers, who suggest that tertiary colors are created by intermixing pairs of secondary colors: orange-green, green-purple, purple-orange; or by intermixing complementary colors. This approach to tertiary color relates specifically to color in the form of paints, pigments, and dyes.

Comparison of RGB and RYB color wheels
The RYB color wheel was invented centuries before the 1890s, when it was found by experiment that magenta, yellow, and cyan are the primary colors of pigment, not red, yellow, and blue.

The RGB color wheel has largely replaced the traditional RYB color wheel because it is possible to display much brighter and more saturated colors using the primary and secondary colors of the RGB color wheel. In the terminology of color theory, RGB color space and CMY color space have a much larger color gamut than RYB color space.

RGB or CMYK primary, secondary, and tertiary colors

The primary colors in an RGB color wheel are red, green, and blue, because these are the three additive colors—the primary colors of light. The secondary colors in an RGB color wheel are cyan, magenta, and yellow because these are the three subtractive colors—the primary colors of pigment.

The tertiary color names used in the descriptions of RGB (or equivalently CMYK) systems are shown below.

Tertiary hue terms

The terms for the RGB tertiary colors are not set. The names for the twelve quaternary colors are more variable, if they exist at all.

Traditional painting (RYB)

The primary colors in an RYB color wheel are red, yellow, and blue. The secondary colors — green, purple, and orange — are made by combining the primary colors.

In the red–yellow–blue system as used in traditional painting and interior design, tertiary colors are typically named by combining the names of the adjacent primary and secondary.

Tertiary- and quaternary-color terms

The terms for the RYB tertiary colors are not set. For the six RYB hues intermediate between the RYB primary and secondary colors, the names amber/marigold (yellow–orange), vermilion/cinnabar (red–orange), magenta (red–purple), violet (blue–purple), teal/aqua (blue-green), and chartreuse/lime green (yellow–green) are commonly found. The names for the twelve quaternary colors are more variable, if they exist at all, though indigo and scarlet are standard for blue–violet and red–vermilion.

In another sense, a tertiary color is obtained by mixing secondary-colored pigments. These three colors are russet (orange–purple), slate (purple–green), and citron (green–orange), with the corresponding three quaternary colors plum (russet–slate), sage (slate–citron), buff (citron–russet) (with olive sometimes used for either slate or citron). Beyond that are shades of grey (blue grey and brown greys), which approach but never quite reach black.

The RYB color terminology outlined above and in the color samples shown below is ultimately derived from the 1835 book Chromatography, an analysis of the RYB color wheel by George Field, a chemist who specialized in pigments and dyes.

See also
Color wheel
Color theory

References

Tertiary colors